Xenorma pictifrons is a moth of the family Notodontidae. It is found mainly in Peru.

References 

Moths described in 1907
Notodontidae of South America